Iván H. Ayala Cádiz (born c. 1940) is a university professor and attorney. He was mayor of Ponce, Puerto Rico after the resignation of mayor José Dapena Thompson in 1988, and until 2 January 1989.

Assignment
Ayala Cádiz was previously assistant dean at the Pontifical Catholic University of Puerto Rico School of Law. He completed Dapena Thompson's last few weeks mayoral term (December 1988 to January 1989) via appointment by his political party, the PNP. In 1988, former elected mayor Dapena Thompson was charged as co-author of embezzlement of federal funds from HUD; as a result he resigned as mayor. Ayala Cádiz had also been a Superior Court Judge in 2004.

Notes

References

See also

 List of Puerto Ricans

Year of birth uncertain
1930s births
Living people
Mayors of Ponce, Puerto Rico
Puerto Rican Roman Catholics